Hussainabad, also known as Gidu Bandar is a town in Hyderabad city in Sindh, Pakistan near the Indus River. Hussainabad is the local name of the town. Pakistan's oldest mental hospital is also here.

Notables 
Captain Abdul Shakoor Shaheed participated in the Indo-Pakistani War of 1965 and earned medals including "Nishan E Jurat."

Geography 
Mehran Park is near the Indus River (Sindhu Darya).

Shopping 
Zeeshan Plaza River is about 0.6 kilometer from the Indus. It is the town's largest  Plaza. Ali twin towers will be larger, comprising 8 storeys.

In Wapda Colony a hospital is located near a park, jogging area and national bank.

Recreation 
Fishing is popular for species including Palla fish (Ilish).

References

External links 

 

Neighbourhoods of Hyderabad, Sindh
Hyderabad District, Pakistan